Major-General Sir Peter Melvill Melvill  (2 July 1803 – 5 November 1895) was a British military commander in the Bombay Army who was military and naval secretary to the Governor of Bombay.

Early life
Melvill was born at Pendennis Castle, near Falmouth, Cornwall, where his father was Governor. He was the youngest son of Capt. Philip Melvill (1762–1811) and Elizabeth Carey Dobrée (1770–1845). His family was strongly associated with the East India Company. His elder brothers included Sir James Cosmo Melvill, secretary of the East India Company; Philip Melvill, Military Secretary to the India Office; and Henry Melvill, principal of the East India Company College.

Career
He joined the Bombay Army in 1819 and was employed with the revenue survey of Gujarat from 1822–27. He served as Fort Adjutant of the garrison of Bombay and aide-to-camp to the Governor in 1828. In 1829, he  was on special duty in Calcutta as assistant to the Bombay military member of the Financial Commission. In 1836, he was first assistant to the Resident in Cutch and Sind and in 1838 he officiated as Political Agent at the former place. From 1840 to 1859, he served as Secretary to the Government of Bombay. 

He was knighted as a Knight Commander of the Order of the Bath in the 1860 Birthday Honours. He retired with the honorary rank of Major-General in December 1861.

Personal life
In 1836, he married Catherine Mary Robertson, the daughter of John Robertson of Tweedmouth, Berwick-upon-Tweed. They had three daughters in Bombay:

 Elizabeth Margaret Melvill, who married Charles Gonne in Bombay in 1860.
 Catherine Mary Melvill (1838–1872), who married Arthur de Hochepied Larpent, 8th Baron de Hochepied, eldest son of John de Hochepied Larpent, 7th Baron de Hochepied.
 Robina Henrietta Melvill, who died young in India.

He died in Brighton, Sussex, in 1895.

References

External links 
 Sir Peter Melvill Melvill at The National Archives (UK)
 Melvill Family Case Study: The Second Generation at University College London

1803 births
1895 deaths
Knights Commander of the Order of the Bath
People from Cornwall
Peter
British Indian Army officers
British East India Company Army officers